Mollebamba or Mullipampa (Quechua mulli Peruvian pepper tree pampa a large plain, "pepper tree plain") is one of eight districts of the province Santiago de Chuco in Peru.

References